Čremušnica is a village in central Croatia, in the municipality of Gvozd, Sisak-Moslavina County. It is connected by the D6 highway.

Demographics
According to the 2011 census, the village of Čremušnica has 103 inhabitants. This represents 26.41% of its pre-war population according to the 1991 census.

According to the 1991 census, 92.56% of the village population were ethnic Serbs (361/390), 6.41% were ethnic Croats (25/390), 0.77% were Yugoslavs  (3/390), while 0.26% were of other ethnic origin (1/390).

References

Populated places in Sisak-Moslavina County
Serb communities in Croatia